The following is a timeline of the history of the city of Jackson, Mississippi, USA.

19th century

 1821
 Mississippi capital relocated to Jackson from Natchez.
 Graveyard established.
 1822
 January: State legislature in session.
 Town laid out.
 1838 - State Library established.
 1839 - State House built.
 1840
 Vicksburg-Jackson railway begins operating.
 Jackson chartered as a city.
 Penitentiary built.
 1842
 James H. Boyd becomes mayor.
 Governor's mansion built.
 1845 - College opens in Eagle Hotel.
 1846
 City Hall built.
 St. Peter's church dedicated.
 1847 - Mississippi Institute for the Blind founded.
 1858 - New Orleans, Jackson and Great Northern Railroad in operation.
 1861
 January 7: Secession Convention begins.
 City becomes Confederate capital of Mississippi.
 Confederate House (hotel) built.
 1863
 May 14: Battle of Jackson, Mississippi; Union Army takes city.
 July 5–25: Siege of Jackson.
 1864 - July 2–10: Occupation of Jackson by Union Army.
 1866 - Daily Clarion newspaper begins publication.
 1867
 City charter revised.
 Beth Israel Synagogue built.
 1868
 Black and Tan Convention held.
 Colored Citizen’s Monthly begins publication.
 1869
 Mississippi State Fair begins.
 Tougaloo College established near Jackson.
 1870
 People's Journal begins publication.
 Mississippi Penitentiary Library established.
 1882 - Natchez-Jackson railway begins operating.
 1883 - Jackson College for Negroes in operation.
 1885 - Yazoo City-Jackson railway begins operating.
 1890
 Constitutional Convention held.
 Population: 5,920.
 1891 - Confederate monument unveiled.
 1892
 Millsaps College opens.
 Jackson Evening News begins publication.
 1894 - Belhaven College for Young Ladies chartered.
 1898 - Campbell College relocated to Jackson from Vicksburg.

20th century
 1900
 Cathedral of St. Peter the Apostle dedicated.
 Population: 7,816.
 1901 - Century Theatre opens.
 1902
 Mississippi Department of Archives and History and State Museum headquartered in city.
 Art Study Club founded.
 Population: 7,816.
 1903 - Mississippi State Capitol building constructed.
 1906 - YMCA organised locally
 1910 - Population: 21,262.
 1911 - Mississippi Art Association formed.
 1914 - Country Club of Jackson organized.
 1919 - Jackson Zoo opens.
 1920 - The Clarion-Ledger newspaper in publication.
 1920s - NAACP Jackson branch established.
 1923 - Edwards Hotel built.
 1925 - Woodrow Wilson Bridge built.
 1926
 Mississippi Library Commission headquartered in Jackson.
 Glendale Methodist Church established.
 1927 - Municipal Clubhouse Art Gallery opens (approximate date).
 1929 - WJDX radio begins broadcasting.
 1930
 Hinds County Courthouse built.
 Population: 48,282.
 1938 - WSLI radio begins broadcasting.
 1939
 Jackson Advocate newspaper begins publication.
 Pix Theatre built.
 1940 - Population: 62,107.
 1943 - Alamo Theater built.
 1944 - Summers Hotel in business.
 1945 - Jackson Photographic Society founded.
 1947
 Radio Service Company in business (approximate date).
 Mississippi Progressive Voters' League headquartered in city (approximate date).
 1949 - Allen C. Thompson becomes mayor.
 1950
 Trumpet Records in business.
 Population: 98,271.
 1953 - WLBT-TV (television) begins broadcasting.
 1954 - WJTV (television) begins broadcasting.
 1955
 University of Mississippi Medical Center opens.
 Ace Records in business.
 1960 - Population: 144,422.
 1961 - Freedom Rides begin.
 1962
 Jackson Veterans Administration Hospital opens.
 Council of Federated Organizations headquartered in city.
 Mississippi Coliseum built.
 1963
 May 28: Woolworth sit-in.
 June 12: Medgar Evers assassinated.
 1966
 June 26: March Against Fear arrives from Memphis.
 Subway Lounge opens.
 1967 - Malaco recording studio in business.
 1970
 May 14: Jackson State killings.
 Public schools desegregated.
 Hinds Community College campus opens.
 Population: 153,968.
 1970s - Queen of Hearts music club opens.
 1975
 Jackson Mets baseball team relocates to Jackson.
 Smith–Wills Stadium opens.
 Lemuria Books in business.
 1976 - Jackson Camellia Society founded.
 1977 - Roman Catholic Diocese of Jackson established.
 1978 - Southern Coalition for Educational Equity headquartered in city.
 1979 - April: Flood.
 1980 - Population: 202,895.
 1983 - Dons nightclub in business.
 1984 - Methodist WellsFest begins.
 1985 - City adopts mayor-council form of government.
 1989 - J. Kane Ditto becomes mayor.
 1990
 100 Black Men of Jackson (nonprofit organization) founded.
 Population: 196,637.
 1991 - Garden Club of Jackson organized.
 1997 - Harvey Johnson, Jr. becomes mayor.
 1999 - City website online.

21st century

 2000
 Goldring / Woldenberg Institute of Southern Jewish Life founded.
 Population: 184,256.
 2002
 Jackson Free Press begins publication.
 Jackson Senators baseball team formed.
 2005 - Frank Melton becomes mayor.
 2005 - Mississippi Children's Museum opens (December 4, 2005).
 2006 - Eudora Welty House museum opens.
 2008 - Mississippi Black Leadership Summit begins.
 2009
 Leslie B. McLemore becomes mayor, succeeded by Harvey Johnson, Jr.
 Gregg Harper becomes U.S. representative for Mississippi's 3rd congressional district.
 2010
 The Help (movie) filmed in Jackson.
 Population: 173,514.
 2012
 2012 Population Est.: 175,437
 2013 - Chokwe Lumumba becomes mayor.
 2014
 Charles Tillman becomes interim mayor.
 Tony Yarber elected mayor April 22.
2020
  State Flag is replaced

See also
 Jackson history
 List of mayors of Jackson, Mississippi
 List of Landmarks in Hinds County
 National Register of Historic Places listings in Hinds County, Mississippi

References

Bibliography

Published in the 19th century
 
 
 
 

Published in the 20th century
 
 
 
  + Map
 
  (fulltext)
 
 

Published in the 21st century

External links

 Items related to Jackson, Mississippi, various dates (via Digital Public Library of America).
 Materials related to Jackson, Mississippi, various dates (via Library of Congress, Prints & Photos Division)
 

Years in Mississippi
 
Jackson
Jackson
jackson